

Held in law-of-war detention but recommended for transfer if security conditions met

Held in indefinite law-of-war detention and not recommended for transfer

Charged in military commissions system

Convicted in military commissions system

See also
 Enhanced interrogation techniques

Lists of Guantanamo Bay detainees